Carrascal, officially the Municipality of Carrascal (Surigaonon: Lungsod nan Carrascal), is a 4th class municipality in the province of Surigao del Sur, Philippines. According to the 2020 census, it has a population of 24,586 people.

Geography
Unique physical features of Carrascal are the uneven distribution of its lowlands and rolling hills. Carrascal is the boundary town of Surigao del Sur with Surigao del Norte.

Barangays
Carrascal is politically subdivided into 14 barangays. Babuyan, Dahican and Caglayag were converted into a barrio in 1956.

Climate

Carrascal has a tropical rainforest climate (Af) with heavy to very heavy rainfall year-round and with extremely heavy rainfall from December to February. With over 5000 mm of rain, it is the wettest place in the Philippines.

Demographics

Economy

Mining industry
Carrascal, known for its mining economy, is home to a number of large-scale mining firms. In early 2017, CTP Construction and Mining Corporation and Carrascal Nickel Corporation that operated near coastal areas while Marcventures Mining and Development Corporation in a declared watershed were found violating the Department of Environment and Natural Resources (DENR) policy, thus sanctioned for closure. Economic pressures felt immediately by its local stakeholders; controversially and concurrently, the Philippine political machinery intervened at the national stage. Short-lived environmental court sanctions was then rescinded later that same year due to an injunctive relief from "filed motions and appeal for reconsideration" allowing mining re-operations that environmental group Caraga Watch vehemently contested as "inutile and bankrupt mining law and policies;" further prompting for pre-emptive, sensible environmental watch and on-going national/local discussions before waking-up to extractive gas drill operations in its shorelines.

Special areas of economic considerations
The ideal candidate site of proposed wind power projects is located approximately 300 meter masl in the mining area near Carrascal. It is accessible from a highway under perpetual reconstruction and further made accessible by exploration roads constructed by mining companies. The terrain is mostly flat, with minimal vegetation, causing minimal turbulence to wind flow in the area. It overlooks the Philippine Sea from the southeast and the north-west directions. Some permanent deformations of small trees indicate that the wind typically comes from the north-east direction. Ground measurements yielded wind speeds of 8–11 m/s, which, by industry standards has excellent wind power potential. However, further validation studies of at least one year of wind data gathered from the site is nonexistent. Transmission lines of the local cooperative pass through this wind power candidate site, making it more attractive for wind and/ solar energy development to alleviate badly needed energy infrastructure to sustain large scale industrialization and its lofty bid to become the northernmost "city" of Surigao del Sur.

References

External links
 Carrascal Profile at PhilAtlas.com
 Carrascal Profile at the DTI Cities and Municipalities Competitive Index
 [ Philippine Standard Geographic Code]
 Philippine Census Information
 Local Governance Performance Management System
 

Municipalities of Surigao del Sur
Mining communities in the Philippines